Elections for the City of Glasgow District Council took place in 1974, alongside elections to the councils of Scotland's various other districts. This was the first election to the City of Glasgow District Council, and saw Labour winning 55 of the council's 72 seats.

Aggregate results

References

1974
1974 Scottish local elections